Air Traffic Controller is a 1978 video game written by air traffic controller David Mannering, and released by Creative Computing for the TRS-80 Model I and Exidy Sorcerer in 1978, and for the Apple II, Apple II Plus and Sol-20 in 1979. It was later rewritten by Will Fastie and Bill Appelbaum for Data General AOS in 1980, and ported to DOS for release by PC Disk Magazine in 1983.

An enhanced version titled Advanced Air Traffic Controller was released by Creative Computing in 1981 for the TRS-80, Apple II, Commodore PET, and Atari 800.

Gameplay
Air Traffic Controller is a game in which the player directs local air traffic.

Reception
Alan Isabelle reviewed Air Traffic Controller in The Space Gamer, commenting that it was "Unquestionably worth [the price]. I highly recommend this to anyone with the computer to run it.".

Reviews
Moves #56, p24-25

See also
Kennedy Approach

References

External links

Air Traffic Controller for Windows
Advanced Air Traffic Controller at Atari Mania
Review in 80-US
Book of Atari Software 1983
Article in ANALOG Computing

1978 video games
Apple II games
Simulation video games
TRS-80 games
Video games developed in the United States